Junior Herbert Staveley was a Canadian politician who represented Weyburn as a Liberal in the Legislative Assembly of Saskatchewan from December 13, 1961 to March 18, 1964.

References 

20th-century Canadian politicians
Saskatchewan Liberal Party MLAs